IBCT is a Belgian-based, Irish-registered women's road cycling team that was founded in 2018. In its first season in 2019, the team won the Belgian Cup. Following the 2020 season, that was extensively affected by the COVID-19 pandemic in Europe, the team announced their intention to become a UCI Women's Continental Team for the 2021 season.

Team roster

Major results
2021
Binche–Chimay–Binche pour Dames, Sara Van de Vel

National champions
2021
 Finland Road Race, Antonia Gröndahl
 Croatia Road Race, Maja Perinović
 Austria Track (Omnium), Verena Eberhardt
 Austria Track (Scratch), Verena Eberhardt
 Austria Track (Elimination), Verena Eberhardt
 Austria Track (Points race), Verena Eberhardt
 Ireland Track, (Individual pursuit), Kelly Murphy
 Switzerland Track (Omnium), Aline Seitz
 Switzerland Track (Madison), Aline Seitz
 Switzerland Track (Points race), Aline Seitz
2022
 Ireland Road Race, Alice Sharpe

References

External links

Cycling teams based in Belgium
Cycling teams established in 2018